The University of Kentucky College of Social Work is a college at University of Kentucky, Lexington, Kentucky that awards undergraduate and graduate degrees in social work.  It was first established as in 1938 as the Department of Social Work within the university's College of Arts and Sciences.  In 1969 the department became the separate College of Social Professions, and was given the current name in 1980.

The college offers Bachelors of Arts, Master of Arts and Doctoral degrees in Social Work degree.

References

Social Work
Schools of social work in the United States
1969 establishments in Kentucky
Educational institutions established in 1969